Henri-Godefroi-Bernard-Alphonse, prince de La Tour d'Auvergne, marquis de Saint-Paulet (21 October 1823 – 5 May 1871) was a French politician of the Second Empire who twice served as Minister of Foreign Affairs for Emperor Napoleon III.

De La Tour d'Auvergne was Ambassador of France to London (1863–69), in which capacity he was a signatory to the Treaty of London in 1867.

Personal life 
He was the son of Melchior de La Tour d'Auvergne-Lauraguais (1794-1849), 1st Marquess of Saint-Paulet and 2nd Baron of the Empire, and Laurence de Chauvigny de Blot.

He was married to Emilie Céleste Montault des Illes (1822-1857), daughter of Charles Montault des Illes and Emilie Adélaïde Bertrand. His only son was:
 Charles-Laurent-Bernard-Godefroi de La Tour d'Auvergne-Lauraguais (1852-1903), 2nd Prince de La Tour d'Auvergne-Lauraguais, 3rd Marquess of Saint-Paulet and 4th Baron of the Empire. Married in 1875 to Marie Léontine Ysoré d'Hervault de Pleumartin, daughter of Anne Antoine Ysoré d'Hervault, 7th Marquis de Pleumartin, and Césarine de Gars de Courcelles. He had three children:
 Henri de La Tour d'Auvergne-Lauraguais (1876-1914), 3rd Prince de La Tour d'Auvergne-Lauraguais, 4th Marquess of Saint-Paulet and 5th Baron of the Empire. Married in 1904 to Elisabeth Berthier de Wagram (1885–1960), daughter of Alexandre Berthier, 3rd Prince of Wagram (grandson of Louis-Alexandre Berthier) and Bertha Clara von Rothschild (daughter of Mayer Carl, Baron von Rothschild).
 Charles de La Tour d'Auvergne-Lauraguais (1877-1940)
 Césarine de La Tour d'Auvergne-Lauraguais (1879-1947)

Ancestry

Honours and titles 
  Marquis de France (succeeded his father in the marquisate of Saint-Paulet, 1849)
  Grand-croix, Légion d'honneur
  Knight, Order of Malta
  Knight, Order of Pius IX
  Knight, Saxe-Ernestine House Order
  Knight Grand Cross, Order of the Red Eagle
  Knight Commander, Order of the Two Sicilies
  Knight Commander, Order of St. Gregory the Great
  Knight of the Order of the Gold Lion of the House of Nassau

See also 
 House of La Tour d'Auvergne
 List of Ambassadors of France to the United Kingdom

References 

Princes of la Tour d'Auvergne
1823 births
1871 deaths
Politicians from Paris
French marquesses
Nobles of the Holy See
Bonapartists
French Foreign Ministers
French Senators of the Second Empire
Ambassadors of France to the United Kingdom
Ambassadors to the Grand Duchy of Tuscany
Ambassadors of France to the Holy See
Ambassadors of France to Prussia
19th-century French diplomats
Collège Stanislas de Paris alumni
Grand Croix of the Légion d'honneur
Knights of Malta
Knights of the Order of Pope Pius IX
Knights Commander of the Order of St Gregory the Great